Dadyaa (sometimes known as Dadyaa: The Woodpeckers of Rotha)  is a 2016 Nepalese Drama short film, directed and written by Pooja Gurung and Bibhusan Basnet. Released under the banner of Eye Core Films. The film stars Devi Damai and Parimal Damai in the lead roles. The film released on 1 September 2016 in Nepal.

Plot 
In a small village in Nepal two elderly couples Atimaley and Devi are only living person in the village. They have to leave their village after their neighbor leaves without any notice to protect their memory.

Cast 

 Devi Damai
 Parimal Damai

Awards 

 Sundance Film Festival 2017

 Special Jury Award  - Chintan Rajbhandari (Won)
 Short Film Grand Jury Prize - Bibhusan Basnet and Pooja Gurung (Nominated)
Short film cinematography (won)

 Kimff 2016

 Fiction Category (Won)

References

External links 

2016 films
2016 drama films
Films set in Nepal
Nepalese drama films